Robert Conrad Anderson (born October 11, 1947) is a former American college and professional football player who was a halfback in the National Football League (NFL) for five seasons during the 1970s.  Anderson played college football for the University of Colorado, and received All-American honors.  He was picked in the first round of the 1970 NFL Draft, and played professional for the Denver Broncos, New England Patriots and Washington Redskins of the NFL.  Anderson was inducted into the College Football Hall of Fame in 2006.

Early years 

Anderson was born in Midland, Michigan.  He attended Boulder High School in Boulder, Colorado; following his senior season at Boulder he won the Gold Helmet award for being Colorado's top football player.

College career 

Anderson attended the University of Colorado, where he played for the Colorado Buffaloes football team from 1967 to 1969. He was the Buffaloes' dual-threat running quarterback during his sophomore and junior seasons, and led the team in both rushing and passing. The 1967 Buffaloes finished 9–2 and second in the Big Eight Conference, and Anderson scored twice as Colorado beat the Miami Hurricanes in the Bluebonnet Bowl. The 1968 Buffaloes finished 8–3, for third in the conference. When the 1969 Buffaloes faced injuries in the backfield, Anderson shifted to running back for the third game. The team finished third in the conference and went to the Liberty Bowl, where he rushed for a bowl record 254 yards and three touchdowns in a 47–33 victory over the Alabama Crimson Tide. Following his senior season, Anderson was recognized as a consensus first-team All-American.

Anderson's older brother Dick played for Colorado as a defensive back from 1965 to 1967.

Professional career 

In five NFL seasons, Anderson played in fifty-three games, and rushed 313 times for 1,282 yards and nine touchdowns. He also had eighty-four receptions for 861 yards and two touchdowns.

Post-playing career 
Anderson formerly served as a long-time broadcaster on the CU Football Network. Anderson also appeared in the 1977 Robbie Benson movie One on One as "Hitman King", as well as in the 1985 Kevin Costner bicycling film "American Flyers" as a reporter.

References

1947 births
Living people
American football quarterbacks
American football running backs
Colorado Buffaloes football players
Denver Broncos players
New England Patriots players
Washington Redskins players
All-American college football players
College Football Hall of Fame inductees
Sportspeople from Midland, Michigan
Sportspeople from Boulder, Colorado
Players of American football from Colorado